Marco Paulo Amaral Bicho (born 7 March 1980 in Barreiro, Setúbal District) is a Portuguese former professional footballer who played as a midfielder, currently manager of Oriental Dragon.

References

External links

1980 births
Living people
Sportspeople from Barreiro, Portugal
Portuguese footballers
Association football midfielders
Liga Portugal 2 players
Segunda Divisão players
C.S. Marítimo players
F.C. Barreirense players
Clube Oriental de Lisboa players
Atlético Clube de Portugal players
G.D. Estoril Praia players
S.U. 1º Dezembro players
C.D. Cova da Piedade players
Casa Pia A.C. players
C.D. Pinhalnovense players
Cypriot First Division players
Doxa Katokopias FC players
C.D. Primeiro de Agosto players
Portuguese expatriate footballers
Expatriate footballers in Cyprus
Expatriate footballers in Angola
Portuguese expatriate sportspeople in Cyprus
Portuguese expatriate sportspeople in Angola
Portuguese football managers
C.D. Fátima managers
C.D. Pinhalnovense managers